Ulus is a town in Bartın Province in the Black Sea region of Turkey. The town continues the ancient Greek colony of Olous (Ωλους). It is the seat of Ulus District. Its population is 3,926 (2021). The mayor is Hasan Hüseyin Uzun (AKP).

References

Populated places in Bartın Province
Towns in Turkey
Ulus District